Mariana is a feminine given name of Latin origin. The masculine equivalent is Marianus, which is derived from Marius. Marianus became Mariano in Italian, Spanish and Portuguese.

Nobles 
Mariana of Austria (1634–1696),  Queen consort of Spain
Marianna Lubomirska (1693–1729), Polish noble
Mariana Koskull (1785–1841), Swedish noble
Mariana Victoria of Spain (1718–1781), Queen of Portugal
Infanta Mariana Francisca of Portugal (1736–1813), daughter of King Joseph I of Portugal
Infanta Mariana Vitória of Portugal (1768–1788), daughter of Queen Maria I of Portugal and King Peter III of Portugal

Writers 
Mariana Codruț (born 1956), Romanian poet, writer and journalist
Mariana Frenk-Westheim (1898–2004), German-Mexican writer and translator
Mariana Griswold Van Rensselaer (1851–1931), American author
Mariana Starke (c. 1761–1831), English author
Juan de Mariana (1536–1624), Spanish Jesuit and historian

Entertainers 
Marianna Efstratiou (born 1962), Greek singer
Mariana Levy (1966–2005), Mexican actress, singer, and television host
Mariana Molina (born 1990), Brazilian actress
Mariana Nicolescu (1948–2022), Romanian opera singer
Mariana Ochoa (born 1979), Mexican singer and actress
Mariana Popova (born 1978), Bulgarian singer
Mariana Renata (born 1983), Indonesian actress
Mariana Seoane (born 1976), Mexican actress, model, and singer
Mariana Sîrbu, Romanian violinist
Mariana Todorova (born 1974), Bulgarian violinist
Mariana Ximenes (born 1981), Brazilian actress

Athletes 
Mariana Avitia (born 1993), Mexican archer
Mariana Chirila (born 1964), Romanian distance runner 
Mariana Constantin (born 1960), Romanian artistic gymnast
Mariana Díaz Oliva (born 1976), Argentinian tennis player
Mariana Henriques (born 1994), Angolan swimmer
Mariana Ohata (born 1978), Brazilian athlete
Mariana Pajón (born 1991), Colombian cyclist
Mariana Roriz (born 1980), Brazilian water polo player
Mariana Simeanu (born 1964), Romanian middle-distance runner 
Mariana Simionescu (born 1956), Romanian tennis player
Mariana Solomon (born 1980), Romanian triple jumper

Other people 
Mariana Becker (born early 1970s), Brazilian sports journalist and television reporter
Mariana Bracetti (1825–1903), leader of the Puerto Rico independence movement
Mariana Wright Chapman (1843-1907), American social reformer, suffragist
Mariana Drăgescu (1912–2013), Romanian military aviator during World War II
Mariana J. Kaplan, Mexican-American rheumatologist and physician-scientist
Marianna Knottenbelt (born 1949), Dutch-Canadian photographer, architect and real-estate developer
Mariana Kotzeva (born 1967), Bulgarian statistician and econometrician
Mariana Loya (born 1979), American beauty queen
Mariana Mazzucato, born June 16, 1968) Italian economist
Mariana Pfaelzer (1926–2015), United States federal judge
Mariana de Pineda Muñoz (1804–1831), martyr of Spanish liberalism
Marianna Pineda (1925–1996), American sculptor
Mariana Wolfner, American molecular biologist and geneticist

See also
 Marijana
 Maryanne

References

Italian feminine given names
Latin feminine given names
Portuguese feminine given names
Spanish feminine given names
Romanian feminine given names